Felipe Neto Rodrigues Vieira (born January 21, 1988) is a Brazilian YouTuber, businessman, actor, comedian, writer and philanthropist, currently having 44.7 million subscribers and more than fifteen billion accumulated views. He is also the brother of YouTuber Luccas Neto. Currently, his videos focus on general entertainment.

Felipe is the founder of Paramaker, a business of network inside of YouTube, which owns channels like Parafernalha and IGN Brasil Network, managing approximately  channels, as an effort to professionalize the online video market in Brazil. He sold the company in 2015 to focus on his YouTube channel.

Felipe has also engaged in other business activities as he and his brother created "Neto's", a food kiosk that sold "coxinhas", a popular Brazilian food. The brothers ended the project after Felipe became vegetarian.

In 2020, he was included on Times list of the 100 most influential people in the world.

Early life 
Felipe Neto was born on January 21, 1988, in Rio de Janeiro to a Brazilian father and a Portuguese mother. He has dual Brazilian and Portuguese citizenship. Felipe is the most-known fan of the Brazilian sports club Botafogo FR, a club which he has sponsored, and also the Portuguese club FC Porto. He currently lives in Barra da Tijuca a neighborhood in Rio de Janeiro.

Filmography

Web

Film

Advertisements

Theater

Publications

Awards and nominations

Controversies 
As a popular YouTuber in Brazil, Felipe occasionally streams his online games to his audience. He was caught cheating in online chess games in 2021. He admitted to being assisted by a chess engine while playing and argued that he was instructed by a chess coach to do so as it would be an adequate training method to improve his knowledge of chess.

References

External links 
 
 
 

1988 births
Living people
Brazilian people of Portuguese descent
Brazilian YouTubers
Internet activists
People from Rio de Janeiro (city)